Clements is an unincorporated community in St. Mary's County, Maryland, United States. Clements is located in northern St. Mary's County. ZIP Code 20624—Area Code 301—Time Zone Eastern—Population  1,282.

The community derives its name from Saint Clement parish on the island of Jersey.

References

Unincorporated communities in St. Mary's County, Maryland
Unincorporated communities in Maryland